Qixingyan may refer to:

Seven-star Cave, in Guilin, Guangxi, China
Seven Star Crags, in Zhaoqing, Guangdong, China
Qixingyan (Taiwan), in Pingtung County, Taiwan